Bartolomé González Soltero (1580–1650) was a Roman Catholic prelate who served as Bishop of Santiago de Guatemala (1641–1650).

Biography
Bartolomé González Soltero was born in México in 1580.
On 1 Jul 1641, he was appointed during the papacy of Pope Urban VIII as Bishop of Santiago de Guatemala.
On 5 Jul 1643, he was consecrated bishop by Bartolomé de Benavente y Benavides, Bishop of Antequera. 
He served as Bishop of Santiago de Guatemala until his death on 25 Feb 1650.

References

External links and additional sources
 (for Chronology of Bishops) 
 (for Chronology of Bishops) 

17th-century Roman Catholic bishops in Guatemala
Bishops appointed by Pope Urban VIII
1580 births
1650 deaths
Roman Catholic bishops of Guatemala (pre-1743)